The 30th Intelligence Squadron is an active United States Air Force unit, stationed at Langley Air Force Base, Virginia and operating Distributed Ground Station-1 in association with reserve and Virginia Air National Guard squadrons.

The squadron was first activated as the 460th Reconnaissance Technical Squadron in Vietnam, where it earned two Presidential Unit Citations and two Air Force Outstanding Unit Awards with Combat "V" Device for its support of combat reconnaissance operations in Southeast Asia.  It performed a similar mission for Tactical Air Command from 1977 to 1982.

Mission
The 30th Intelligence Squadron operates Distributed Ground Station 1 at Langley Air Force Base, Virginia.  The station is part of the Air Force Distributed Common Ground System weapon system.  This system produces, exploits and disseminates intelligence information collected from multiple sources, including the Lockheed U-2, Northrop Grumman RQ-4 Global Hawk, General Atomics MQ-9 Reaper and General Atomics MQ-1 Predator, to support contingency operations.

History

Vietnam War
The squadron was first activated as the 460th Reconnaissance Technical Squadron in June 1967 at Tan Son Nhut Air Base, Republic of Vietnam and assigned to the 460th Tactical Reconnaissance Wing.  The squadron absorbed the mission, personnel and equipment of the 13th Reconnaissance Technical Squadron, which moved on paper to Clark Air Base, Philippines.  The squadron processed intelligence information, primarily for the use of Seventh Air Force and its units until it was inactivated in 1970 and its mission transferred to the 12th Reconnaissance Intelligence Technical Squadron, which was already stationed at Tan Son Nhut with the implementation of the Tactical Reconnaissance Intelligence Enhancement Program.  Under this program, the 460th operated a sophisticated reconnaissance technical support facility, designed to do in-depth imagery processing, interpretation, reproduction, and intelligence exploitation with facilities for mass duplication of film for external agencies. The 12th had acted as a command-level reconnaissance technical unit, responsive to the needs of the air component commander of MACV.  The squadron's inactivation and merger of interpretation and production to a single squadron coincided with the reduction of the tactical reconnaissance force in Vietnam marked by the withdrawal of the 16th Tactical Reconnaissance Squadron from Vietnam to Japan.

Reactivation
The squadron was reactivated in the fall of 1977 at Langley Air Force Base, where it provided similar services to Tactical Air Command.

After two redesignations while inactive, the squadron returned to Langley in 1992 as the 30th Air Intelligence Squadron.  It dropped the "Air" from its name in 1994. In the spring of 2011, the squadron's forces were augmented by the 718th Intelligence Squadron, a reserve associate unit whose operations are integrated with those of the 30th.  The 192d Intelligence Squadron of the Virginia Air National Guard acts as an additional associate of the 30th.

Lineage
 Constituted as the 460th Reconnaissance Technical Squadron and activated on 8 May 1967 (not organized)
 Organized on 15 June 1967
 Inactivated on 31 March 1970
 Activated on 1 October 1977
 Inactivated on 1 August 1982
 Redesignated 30th Reconnaissance Technical Squadron on 16 Oct 1984
 Redesignated 30th Air Intelligence Squadron on 1 August 1992
 Activated on 27 August 1992
 Redesignated 30th Intelligence Squadron on 1 October 1994

Assignments
 Pacific Air Forces, 8 May 1967 (not organized)
 460th Tactical Reconnaissance Wing, 15 June 1967 – 31 March 1970
 Ninth Air Force, 1 October 1977
 Tactical Air Command, 1 October 1978 – 1 August 1982
 548th Air Intelligence Group, 27 August 1992
 609th Air Intelligence Group, 1 October 1994
 480th Intelligence Group, 7 December 2001
 497th Intelligence Group, 1 December 2003 – present

Stations
 Tan Son Nhut Air Base, South Vietnam, 15 June 1967 – 31 March 1970
 Langley Air Force Base, Virginia, 1 October 1977 – 1 August 1982
 Langley Air Force Base, Virginia, 27 August 1992 – present

Awards and campaigns

References

Notes

Bibliography

 
 

Intelligence squadrons of the United States Air Force